Al Hunter Ashton (26 June 1957 – 27 April 2007), born Alan Hunter, was an English actor and script writer.

Life
Hunter was born in Birmingham, Warwickshire, and came from a working-class background. Born Alan Hunter (he later changed his name by deed poll to Al Hunter), he wrote scripts for his own amusement from the age of 15; he worked in his spare time as a stand-up comedian in clubs for £15 a night but became a stripper on discovering that he could earn the same amount for shedding his clothes every evening. "My stripping routine was actually funnier than my stand-up one," he said.

He acted under the name "Al Ashton", choosing this to ensure he appeared high up in any alphabetical credits. He wrote under the name "Al Hunter". Later he combined the two, acting and writing under the name "Al Hunter Ashton". He also wrote under the alias Alun Nipper.

Work
His first professional acting work was with a Theatre in Education company in Melton Mowbray, Leicestershire, and he was subsequently cast in Willy Russell plays such as Breezeblock Park (at the Liverpool Playhouse) and Blood Brothers (at the Derby Playhouse). Russell also later commissioned him to write the BBC Schools television play Teaching Matthew (in which Hunter also had a small role as a policeman, 1985), a satire on Russell's own Educating Rita.

Hunter worked very closely with the Stage 22 School of Arts Network in the UK and upon his death, children from the school made their own version of the Queen hit Only the Good Die Young which was dedicated to him and his three young children.

List of acting roles (incomplete)
Remembrance. John.
Angels. Played Mike Hathaway in the long running BBC TV drama series.
Crossroads. Soap. Played Ray Grice. 108 episodes. Central TV.
The Brittas Empire. Appeared as a tanker driver in Episode 8 of Series 4.
Jack & the Beanstalk. Pantomime. Playing Fireman Sampson in the Stage 22 production at the Towngate Theatre, Basildon - Christmas 2006.
Jekyll. Serial drama. Played Christopher.
London's Burning. LWT's drama series about firefighters. Played Raymond "Pitbull" Darby, the loud mouthed station bully.
Emmerdale. Soap. Played Colin Long. 7 episodes. Yorkshire Television.
Mr In-Between. Film. Played Fat Dave.
The 10th Kingdom A TV mini-series. As a prisoner alongside Jimmy Nail (Clayface the Goblin).
Wire in the Blood. Darren Toynton. ITV. Dir: Robson Green

List of writing credits (incomplete)
Alison BBC TV screenplay 
EastEnders. BBC TV soap. Regular contributor since 1987. Writer/storyliner.
The Bill. (Series 4 episode 17 Runaround) 
Holby City. Lead core writer, storyliner, producer.
Pieces of a Silver Lining. BBC Afternoon Theatre with Martin Jameson
Safe. Bafta winner. Best Single Drama. see External links below
Teaching Matthew BBC TV script writer and actorThe Broker's Man. Creator and writer. (with Tim O'Mara).The Firm. Screen Two. Writer (as Al Hunter)Alive and Kicking. Film shown in series 3 of BBC drama anthology 'Screen One'.

Death
On 27 April 2007 Al Hunter Ashton died of heart failure in his home in High Wycombe, Buckinghamshire. Episode eight of series five of the New Tricks TV series, titled "Mad Dogs", was dedicated to his memory.

AwardsSafe'' (1993), a harrowing tale of homelessness. Won the 1994 Bafta TV Award as Best Single Drama. Al Ashton, writer.

Filmography

External links
 
Safe (1993)  at Screenonline

  BBC Comedy Guide

Notes

1957 births
2007 deaths
English male film actors
English soap opera writers
English male television actors
British male television writers
20th-century English screenwriters